Melica scaberrima, is a species of grass that can be found in Yunnan, China, Nepal, Pakistan and northern part of India (including Kashmir).

Description
The species is perennial and have elongated rhizomes. The species leaf-sheaths are tubular and scabrous with one of their length being closed.

Florets are diminished at the apex.

Both the lower and upper glumes are elliptic, keelless, membranous, and have acute apexes. Palea is 2-veined. Flowers are fleshy, oblong, truncate, have 2 lodicules, and grow together. They have 3 anthers which have fruits that are caryopsis and have an additional pericarp with linear hilum.

Ecology
It blooms from July to August.

References

Further reading

scaberrima
Endemic flora of China
Flora of Asia